Olivier Brunel (–1585) was a Dutch merchant and explorer, born in the Province of Brabant in the 16th century. He was the first to establish trade routes between the Netherlands and Russia. He also explored the northern coast of Russia searching for a route to China and the East Indies.

External links 
 

16th-century Dutch explorers
1550s births
1580s deaths
Dutch polar explorers